The Art of Jazz: Live in Leverkusen  is a live album by Art Blakey's Jazz Messengers at the Leverkusen Jazz Festival in Germany on October 9, 1989. To commemorate Blakey's 70th birthday (October 11), the concert featured many special guests—most of whom were former Messengers. Singer Michelle Hendricks sang a song -- "Mr. Blakey"—composed for the occasion by founding Messenger Horace Silver.

Reception

The album was given three stars by Allmusic, and reviewer Scott Yanow says "...the CD concludes with a nearly-13 minute interview that Mike Hennessey conducted with Blakey in 1976 in which the drummer reminisces about the Jazz Messengers' early days. Well worth picking up."

Track listing
 "Two of a Kind" (Terence Blanchard)
 "Moanin'" (Bobby Timmons)
 "Along Came Betty" (Benny Golson)
 "Lester Left Town" (Wayne Shorter)
 "Mr. Blakey" (Horace Silver)
 Drum Duo (Drum duet with Art Blakey and Roy Haynes)
 "Blues March" (Benny Golson)
 Buhaina's Valediction
 Interview

Personnel

Jazz Messengers
Art Blakey - drums
Brian Lynch - trumpet
Frank Lacy - trombone
Javon Jackson - tenor saxophone
Geoff Keezer - piano
Essiet Okon Essiet  - bass

Special Guests
Freddie Hubbard, Terence Blanchard - trumpet
Curtis Fuller - trombone
Jackie McLean, Donald Harrison - alto saxophone
Benny Golson, Wayne Shorter - tenor saxophone
Walter Davis, Jr. - piano
Buster Williams - bass
Roy Haynes - drums
Michelle Hendricks - vocals

References 

Art Blakey live albums
The Jazz Messengers live albums
1985 live albums